Tigist Assefa Tessema (born 28 March 1994) is an Ethiopian long-distance runner, a former 800 metres specialist. After her marathon debut in April 2022, she improved by over 18 minutes and set the third-fastest mark on the world all-time list (currently fifth) at the 2022 Berlin Marathon.

In 2013, Assefa was the 800 metres bronze medallist at the African Junior Championships. With her 2014 personal best in the event, she became in 2022 in Berlin the first woman in history to break two minutes for 800 m and 2:20 for the marathon.

Career
In August 2014, Tigist Assefa placed fourth in the women's 800 metres at the African Championships in Athletics in Marrakesh, Morocco. The same month, she won the race at the ISTAF Berlin meet in Germany. In September, she finished fourth over the distance at the IAAF Continental Cup, also held in Marrakesh.

She was eliminated in the 800 m first round of the 2016 World Indoor Championships in Portland, Oregon. The 22-year-old represented Ethiopia in the 800 m event at the 2016 Rio Olympics, where she did not qualify from the heats with a season's best of 2:00.21.

She switched to road running in 2018.

In March 2022, Assefa debuted in the marathon distance at the inaugural Riyadh Marathon in Saudi Arabia, finishing seventh with a time of 2:34:01. At the Berlin Marathon in September, the 28-year-old stopped the clock at two hours 15 minutes 37 seconds, an over 18 minutes improvement and the third-fastest women's mark ever at the time, slower only than 2:14:04 of the world record-holder Brigid Kosgei and 2:15:25 of the former record-holder Paula Radcliffe. Thus she won by over two minutes, bettered a course record by more than two and a half minutes, and set an Ethiopian record. In a race of negative splits, her second half ran in a time of 67:24 was faster than her then half marathon personal best (67:28), which she set in April of that year when winning the adizero Road to Records event in Herzogenaurach, also in Germany.

Achievements

Personal bests
All information from World Athletics profile.

International competitions

References

External links

 

1996 births
Living people
Ethiopian female middle-distance runners
Olympic athletes of Ethiopia
Athletes (track and field) at the 2016 Summer Olympics
21st-century Ethiopian women
Ethiopian female long-distance runners
Berlin Marathon female winners